Rineloricaria misionera is a species of catfish in the family Loricariidae. It is a freshwater fish native to South America, where it occurs in the basins of the Paraná River and the Uruguay River in Argentina. Its type locality is located within Misiones Province, which the species is named after. It is typically found in small streams with swift currents and substrates composed of rocks and sand. It is known to be nocturnal, seeking shelter between rocks during the day. The species reaches  in standard length and is believed to be a facultative air-breather.

References 

Loricariini
Fish described in 2005
Catfish of South America